Geraldine Jones may refer to:

 Geraldine Jones (character), a recurring comedy persona of Flip Wilson
 Geraldine Jones, the first woman president of the Oxford Union (in 1968), and later panellist on the BBC Radio 4 show Just a Minute.